The Asian glossy starling (Aplonis panayensis) is a species of starling in the family Sturnidae. It is found in Bangladesh, Brunei, India, Indonesia, Malaysia, Myanmar, the Philippines, Singapore, Taiwan (introduced) and Thailand. Its natural habitats are subtropical or tropical moist lowland forest and subtropical or tropical mangrove forest. There is also a huge number of this species inhabiting towns and cities, where they take refuge in abandoned buildings and trees. They often move in large groups and are considered one of the noisiest species of birds. In the Philippines, it is known as kulansiyang, galansiyang, or kuling-dagat.

The following subspecies are recognised by the International Ornithological Congress:

 A. p. affinis (Blyth, 1876) – northeastern India, Bangladesh, southwestern Myanmar
 A. p. tytleri (Hume, 1873) – Andaman and north Nicobar Islands
 A. p. albiris Abdulali, 1967 – central and southern Nicobar Islands
 A. p. strigata (Horsfield, 1821) – Malay Peninsula, Sumatra, Java, and west Borneo
 A. p. altirostris (Salvadori, 1887) – Simeulue, Banyak Islands, and Nias Island
 A. p. nesodramus (Oberholser, 1926) – Babi Island
 A. p. pachistorhina (Oberholser, 1912) – Batu and Mentawai Islands
 A. p. enganensis (Salvadori, 1892) – Enggano Islands
 A. p. heterochlora (Oberholser, 1917) – Anambas and Natuna Islands
 A. p. eustathis (Oberholser, 1926) – east Borneo
 A. p. alipodis (Oberholser, 1926) – Panjang, Maratua and Derawan Islands
 A. p. gusti Stresemann, 1913 – Bali

 A. p. sanghirensis (Salvadori, 1876) – Sangihe and Talaud Islands
 A. p. panayensis (Scopoli, 1786) – north Sulawesi and the Philippines

Gallery

References

Asian glossy starling
Birds of Southeast Asia
Asian glossy starling
Taxonomy articles created by Polbot